Akeake is the name of at least three New Zealand species of tree:

Dodonaea viscosa, akeake
Olearia avicenniifolia, mountain akeake or tree daisy
Olearia traversiorum, Chatham Island akeake or Chatham Island tree daisy

The species are small trees. The name goes back to pre-European times when it was used in different areas of New Zealand. In post-European times it is used most frequently, but not exclusively, for Dodonaea viscosa.

Trees of New Zealand